Valpiana is a village in Tuscany, central Italy, administratively a frazione of the comune of Massa Marittima, province of Grosseto, in the area of the Colline Metallifere. At the time of the 2001 census its population amounted to 453.

Valpiana is about 45 km from Grosseto and 7 km from Massa Marittima.

History 
It was an ancient industrial centre of medieval Maremma and its first furnaces were built by Tollo degli Albizzeschi, father of more known saint Bernardino degli Albizzeschi. The industrial centre was closed in 1885.

Main sights 
 Cristo Re, main parish church of the village, it was built in the 17th century
 Palazzo of Ministers (16th century), old house of the administrators of the furnaces.
 Valpiana ironworks, ancient buildings dating from the 14th century to the 19th century, they attest the long tradition of iron in Valpiana.
 Aquarium Mondo Marino, the second largest aquarium in Tuscany, opened in 2009.

References

Bibliography 
 Aldo Mazzolai, Guida della Maremma. Percorsi tra arte e natura, Le Lettere, Florence, 1997.

See also 
 Ghirlanda
 Montebamboli
 Niccioleta
 Prata, Massa Marittima
 Tatti, Massa Marittima

Frazioni of Massa Marittima